Phalonidia lojana is a species of moth of the family Tortricidae. It is found in Loja Province, Ecuador.

The wingspan is about 21 mm. The ground color of the forewings is creamy, slightly suffused with ferruginous in the distal third and dotted and strigulated (finely streaked) with pale rust. The remaining markings are rust. The hindwings are white creamy, but darker at the apex.

References

Moths described in 2002
Phalonidia